Shikha Singh Shah (born 7 February 1986) is an Indian actress notable for her work in Indian television industry.

Career

Acting
Singh's acting debut was in Left Right Left as Cadet Aakriti Bhat. She was next seen in Zee TV's Meri Doli Tere Angana and Ghar Ki Lakshmi Betiyaan. and In 2010, she entered Colors TV's social drama Na Aana Is Des Laado as Amba Sangwan before her exit from it in 2011.

Singh collaborated with Colors TV third and consecutive time, for Phulwa. She begun 2013 with Life OK's 26/12 in the character of Shahana Malik and next bagged Adaalat. It was followed playing Meghna Singhania in Sasural Simar Ka on Colors, and then she enacted brave girl warrior Shikhandi in epical TV series Mahabharat; both roles were from 2013 to 2014.

From 2014 to 2020, Singh portrayed the appreciative character Alia Mehra in Kumkum Bhagya; between this she was cast for the same role on its spin-off Kundali Bhagya, and also she was cast in Chandra Nandini on Star Plus and &TV's popular episodic Laal Ishq as Vibha.

In 2022, she portrayed Riddhi Sharma in Colors TV's Naagin 6.

Other works
Apart from acting, Singh appeared as herself in Sony Entertainment Television's Jubilee Comedy Circus (2008). She anchored the channel exchanging series Gold Safe (2009–10). She was seen on Comedy Nights Bachao in 2015 & 2016.

Personal life
Singh married Karan Shah in April 2016. They had a daughter in June 2020.

Filmography

Television

References

External links

Living people
Indian television actresses
Indian soap opera actresses
Actors from Mumbai
1986 births